Thomas Stevens (1828–1888) was a 19th-century weaver from Coventry, famous for his invention of the stevengraph, a woven silk picture.

Biography

In the 19th century the town of Coventry, England, was the centre of a ribbon weaving industry. Thomas Stevens was born in Foleshill, just to the north of Coventry, in 1828 to a relatively poor family. Stevens worked for Pears and Franklin, a local ribbon weavers in Coventry, and by 1854 had created his own ribbon firm. In 1860, however, the Cobden–Chevalier Treaty was signed; this free trade treaty introduced new competition into the industry, leading to a collapse in the local ribbon economy and a huge loss of employment in Coventry.

Stevens had considerable experience of experimenting with the Jacquard loom and responded to the local recession by trying to develop new products. He had invented a way of using the programmable loom to weave colourful pictures from silk. By 1862, Stevens could produce four different designs; he attempted to appeal to the mass market, selling his products between six pence and fifteen shillings each. Some of these pictures were used for bookmarks, greetings cards and specialised products for the Admiralty.

Business boomed and Stevens acquired two larger factories in turn; by 1875 he was calling his product the "Stevengraph", named after himself. He exhibited internationally in America, France and Holland, winning some 30 medals and diplomas. In 1878 Stevens moved to London and began to mount his Stevengraphs as framed pictures - by the late 1880s Stevens had over 900 different designs. In 1888 Stevens died following a throat operation and was buried in Coventry.

Legacy
By the 1930s, Stevengraphs were considered collectable items, but the hobby was considered eccentric and mainly confined to female collectors. During the Second World War Coventry was attacked by German bombers; on 14 November 1940 the Coventry Blitz occurred, apparently destroying the Stevens factory and the records of the Stevengraphs. In the late 1950s it emerged that Henry Stephens, a descendant of Thomas, had saved one of the pattern books the night before the attack and kept it in safe storage; Henry donated it to the Coventry City Council, who in turn entrusted it with the Herbert Art Gallery and Museum. Stevengraphs became valuable, with more male collectors entering the hobby. Prices rose, particularly for unusual or rarer images less popular during the Victorian period. A large collection of Stevens' work from his pattern book is still held at the Herbert Art Gallery and Museum.

References

Bibliography
Lynes, Alice. (n.d.) Thomas Stevens And His Silk Ribbon Pictures. Local History Pamphlet No.2. Coventry: Coventry City Libraries.
Wollen, Peter. (2004) Paris/Manhattan: Writings on Art. London: Verso. .

People from Coventry
1828 births
1888 deaths
British weavers